Gorgon is a clone of the arcade game Defender, a horizontally-scrolling shooter, for the Apple II. It was programmed by Nasir Gebelli and published by Sirius Software in June 1981.

Gameplay

In Gorgon, the player flies a spaceship across a side-scrolling landscape while protecting civilians on the ground from aliens that drop down from the top of the screen to try to carry them off.

The game uses keyboard controls, with the A, Z, and left/right arrow keys for movement and the space bar for firing.

Development
The graphics were drawn with Sirius's own E-Z Draw software (1980).

Reception
By June 1982, Gorgon had sold 23,000 copies, making it one of the best-selling computer games at the time. Bill Kunkel of Electronic Games called the game "another winner from ace designer Nasir" and "fine home version" of Defender, only criticizing the Apple II's lack of joystick support at the time. BYTE stated that Gorgon "is well programmed and much more enjoyable than the arcade version [and] should provide many hours of enjoyment ... 
Rest assured that you Nasir Gebelli fans will not be disappointed by this one!"

References

1981 video games
Apple II games
Apple II-only games
Horizontally scrolling shooters
Sirius Software games
Video game clones
Video games developed in the United States
Single-player video games